Mi pequeña Soledad (My little Soledad) is a Mexican telenovela produced by Verónica Castro for Televisa in 1990.

Verónica Castro starred as protagonist, while Rosa María Bianchi, Salvador Pineda, July Furlong and Roberto Ballesteros starred as antagonists.

Plot
As a young girl, Isadora (Verónica Castro) is voted to become the Silver Queen in Taxco, a Mexican village known for its silver handicrafts. The night before the coronation, in an act of jealousy, Isadora's former boyfriend Gerardo (Salvador Pineda) rapes her. For weeks Isadora refuses to tell anyone, but because of the strong love and trust she feels for her fiancé José Luis (Antonio De Carlo), she decides to tell him about it.

Just before the wedding, Gerardo confronts José Luis and provokes a fight. José Luis never arrives at the church for his wedding, and is later found stabbed to death. Isadora is carrying Gerardo's child, and her stepmother Piedad (Rosa María Bianchi) is terrified that this will force Gerardo to marry her.

Piedad is jealous of Isadora, and decides to get rid of the child at the first opportunity. Isadora leaves her family and moves to the city. Several years later, Soledad (also played by Verónica Castro) has grown into a kind and beautiful woman, and she moves to the city where she and Isadora meet.

Cast

Awards

Theme song
 The theme songs is "Mi pequeña Soledad" sung by (Verónica Castro)
 Also in the Telenovela Chiquita Pero Picosa sung by (Verónica Castro)
 This theme song became, and remains, Veronica's signature song.

References

External links 
 

1990 telenovelas
Mexican telenovelas
1990 Mexican television series debuts
1990 Mexican television series endings
Spanish-language telenovelas
Television shows set in Mexico City
Televisa telenovelas